LNN may refer to:
 Late Nite News with Loyiso Gola, a South African television programme
 Lindsay Manufacturing, a manufacturer of irrigation systems
 London News Network, a television news service
 Lorediakarkar language, an Austronesian language of Vanuatu
 Willoughby Lost Nation Municipal Airport, Ohio, United States